Ashanti (also called Ashanti, Land of No Mercy) is a 1979 action adventure film directed by Richard Fleischer and starring Michael Caine, Peter Ustinov, Kabir Bedi, Beverly Johnson, Omar Sharif, Rex Harrison, and William Holden. It is based on the 1974 novel Ébano by Alberto Vázquez-Figueroa, with a screenplay written by Stephen Geller and an uncredited George MacDonald Fraser. The story is set against the background of modern-day slave trading, with a man who determinedly takes on a perilous journey in order to find his beautiful wife, who has been kidnapped by brutal slave traders.

Despite its impressive cast and setting (on location in the Sahara, and in Kenya, Israel, and Sicily), Ashanti was widely panned by critics upon release. Michael Caine was reportedly very disappointed with the project and claims it was the third worst film along with his previous films The Magus and The Swarm (despite appearing in other failures in the 1980s). It was one of Holden's final films, and the final film of cinematographer Aldo Tonti.

Plot summary
David and Anansa Linderby are doctors with the World Health Organization. On a medical mission carrying out an inoculation programme, they visit a West African village. While David takes photographs of tribal dancers, Anansa goes swimming alone. She is attacked and abducted by slave traders led by Suleiman, who mistake her for an Ashanti local. The police can do nothing to find her and David has almost given up hope when he hears rumours that Anansa has been kidnapped by Suleiman to be sold to an Arab, Prince Hassan. The African authorities deny that a slave trade even exists and David must find help in a shadowy world where the rescuers of slaves are as ruthless as the traders. As David tracks Anansa across Africa and the Sahara desert, he is helped by a member of the Anti-Slavery League, a mercenary helicopter pilot and Malik, an African who seeks revenge on Suleiman.

Cast

Production
The project was announced in January 1978 with Richard C. Sarafian to direct, Michael Caine, Omar Sharif, Peter Ustinov and Telly Savalas to star. Ken Norton was offered a role in the film but turned it down.

The film was shot on location in Kenya starting in April. Two weeks into filming, director Richard Sarafian was sacked and replaced by Richard Fleischer. The female lead and cinematographer were fired. Telly Savalas who was in the cast had to drop out. Fleischer arranged for the script to be rewritten. George MacDonald Fraser, who had recently adapted Tai Pan for the producers, was commissioned to work on the script to help boost Sharif's part.

Director Fleischer and co-star Beverly Johnson were supposedly both removed from filming two-thirds of the way through the shoot due to sunstroke. However, an interview with Ms. Johnson included on the 2013 Severin Films Blu-ray edition of Ashanti makes no reference to these "removals", suggesting that they may belong to myth.

See also
 Ashanti Empire
 List of films featuring slavery

References

External links
 
 
 

1970s action adventure films
1979 films
American chase films
American adventure drama films
Films about kidnapping
Films about prostitution
Films about slavery
Films directed by Richard Fleischer
Films set in Africa
Warner Bros. films
Columbia Pictures films
American action adventure films
Films shot in Israel
Films shot in Kenya
Films with screenplays by George MacDonald Fraser
1970s chase films
1970s English-language films
1970s American films
Films set in the Sahara